The Y Not Festival is an annual music festival held in Pikehall, Derbyshire, United Kingdom. It first took place in 2005, at a disused quarry site as a party for around 120 people organised by Ralph Broadbent who was planning a party in the garden of his parents' house but had to relocate when his parents didn't go away as planned. For the first year it went under the name of the Big Gin Festival (a play on its location near Biggin in the Peak District). The main stage at the festival has retained this name as The Big Gin Stage. The following year it was renamed Y Not Festival with the public being invited and with attendances increasing year on year (to 15,000 in 2015) and eventually relocating to its current site at Pikehall in Derbyshire. As a small independent festival the event has won many awards and accolades such as best small festival in 2012 and the prize for best grass roots event and best toilets at the 2011 UK Festival Awards. In 2016 it was sold to Global Radio's festival division, Broadwick Live, along with Truck Festival and the rest of Broadbent's company (Count of Ten) portfolio.

In 2019, Y Not Festival was bought back by its original owners, and in 2022, after a two-year enforced break, enjoyed its return as an independent festival.

In November 2022, it was announced the UK-company, Superstruct Entertainment, had acquired a majority stake in Y Not Festival.

Y Not Festival 2022 
Y Not Festival 2022 was held on 28–31 July 2022. The Kooks, Stereophonics, Courteeners and Blossoms played headline sets across the weekend. Other notable performances included a special guest slot from Levellers on Saturday afternoon, and The Vaccines' packed out Sunday evening set, when the crowd found out that England had won the UEFA Women's European Championship, beating Germany 2–1 in the final.

Line up

Big Gin Stage

The Quarry Stage

Y Not Festival 2019 
Y Not Festival 2019 was held on 25–28 July 2019. Two Door cinema Club played a headline set on the Saturday Night, two years after their set was cancelled in 2017. Other notable performances included a special guest slot from IDLES on Saturday afternoon, Gerry Cinnamon's packed out Friday teatime session and after-headliner DJ slots from Mike Skinner from The Streets and Jax Jones. Despite it being announced that the festival arena would be opened at 4 pm, the gates were not opened until approximately 6:20 pm. Because of this The Wired and Airways did not perform due to time.

Line up

Big Gin Stage

The Quarry Stage

The Giant Squid

Y Not Festival 2018 
As a result of the 2017 cancellation, in 2018 Y Not relocated to Aston Hill Farm, close to the old site of Mouldridge Lane. 2018 hosted such bands as The Libertines, Manic Street Preachers, Seasick Steve and Jamiroquai.

Line up

Big Gin Stage

The Quarry Stage

The Giant Squid

Y Not Festival 2017 
In 2017 the festival was affected by adverse weather conditions from the Friday and was eventually cancelled by the organisers on the final day.

Line up

Big Gin Stage

The Quarry Stage

Y Not Festival 2016 
The 2016 festival was held between 28 and 31 July. It was headlined by Editors, Noel Gallagher's High Flying Birds, Madness, The Hives, Catfish and the Bottlemen and The Cribs.

Line up

Big Gin Stage

The Quarry

The Giant Squid

Y Not Festival 2015 
The 2015 festival was held between 31 July and 2 August. The festival was headlined by Snoop Dogg, Basement Jaxx and Primal Scream. Ash, Beans on Toast, Asylums and Bloxed Beats played the festival on Thursday 30 July as the early entry acts.

Line up

Big Gin Stage

The Quarry

The Giant Squid

Y Not Festival 2014 
The 2014 festival was held between 1–3 August. The festival was headlined by White Lies, Dizzee Rascal and Frank Turner.

Line up

Big Gin Stage

The Quarry

The Giant Squid

The Allotment

The Hog & Barrel

Y Not Festival 2013

Line up

Big Gin Stage

The Quarry

The Allotment

The Giant Squid

Y Not Festival 2012 
The 2012 festival was held between 3–5 August. The festival was headlined by The View, The Wombats and We Are Scientists. The festival returned to its usual site in Pikehall.

The festival saw the return of its three music stages, the Big Gin Stage, The Quarry and The Allotment, plus the introduction of a new stage The Giant Squid.

Line up

Big Gin Stage

The Quarry

The Allotment

The Giant Squid

Y Not Festival 2011 
The 2011 festival was held between 5–7 August. The festival was headlined by The Go! Team, Feeder and Maxïmo Park. The festival was once again located in Pikehall.

The festival had three music stages:
 The main stage called "Big Gin Stage" named after the first festival
 A smaller stage called "The Quarry" named after the location of the 2006 festival
 "The Allotment" was a new addition to 2011 which hosted a variety of local bands. "The Allotment" stage was named after a competition was held on Facebook and Twitter.

The festival won two categories at the UK Festival Awards, the grass roots festival award and the prize for the best toilets.

Line up

Big Gin Stage

The Quarry

The Allotment

2010
The Y Not Festival in 2010 was headlined by The Futureheads, The Subways and The Mystery Jets. Other acts included Blood Red Shoes, Los Campesinos, Darwin Deez, King Pleasure and the Biscuit Boys, OK Go, Get Cape. Wear Cape. Fly, Twisted Wheel, Turin Brakes, Rox, Little Comets, Kid British, Daisy Dares You, Slow Club, Goldheart Assembly, Jim Lockey & The Solemn Sun, Tubelord, Foy Vance, Max Raptor, Fenech Soler, Sparrow and the Workshop, THePETEBO, Doll & The Kicks, Sketches, Matthew P, Morning Parade, 51/50s, Kill It Kid, and North Atlantic Oscillation.

2009
The Y Not Festival sold out in 2009. The line up on the main stage included The Sunshine Underground, The King Blues, Noah and the Whale, Young Knives, Nine Black Alps, Shotshotstacy, and Esser. Beardyman and Frank Turner were on the acoustic stage. The festival featured many other artists and DJs over the three days of live music.

2008
The third Y Not Festival was again held at Pikehall, Derbyshire.  The festival expanded agfurtherain and around 2000 people attended over three days.  Bigger and more well known acts such as the Mystery Jets, Cage the Elephant, and Frank Turner were on the bill, though neither the Mystery Jets or Cage the Elephant turned up.

2007
The Second Y Not Festival was at held at a new venue, Pikehall, Derbyshire.  This allowed the festival to sprawl over a larger area.  Around 1000 people attended over the three days.

2006
The first Y Not Festival was held in a quarry in Derbyshire.  Around 500 people attended over three days.  Many of the bands that played were unsigned or local.  A DVD documentary was made about this festival.

Big Gin 
Before it was even known as Y Not Festival it was a small gathering of sixth form pupils from Queen Elizabeth's Grammar School, Ashbourne.  The gathering had a few local bands and a couple of DJs played on two nights.

References

Music festivals in Derbyshire
Annual events in the United Kingdom
Recurring events established in 2006
2006 establishments in England